Bhatghar Dam, is a gravity dam on Velvandi(वेळवंडी) river near Bhor, Pune district in State of Maharashtra in India.
One of the oldest dams in Maharashtra
constructed by British

Specifications

Purpose
 Irrigation
 Hydroelectricity

See also
 Dams in Maharashtra
 List of reservoirs and dams in India

References

Dams completed in 1927
Dams in Pune district
1927 establishments in India
20th-century architecture in India